Mammy is a 1951 French drama film directed by Jean Stelli and starring Gaby Morlay, Pierre Larquey and Françoise Arnoul.

It was shot at the Saint-Maurice Studios in Paris. The film's sets were designed by the art director Raymond Druart.

Synopsis
Madame Pierre, known as Mammy, dotes on her grandson Maurice. He has been away in Canada for ten years, and is a disreputable lowlife. However her husband has created a false image of a decent, happily-married architect for her benefit. When news comes of Maurice's disappearance in a plane crash, Mammy is so distraught that her husband hires a young couple to pose as Maurice and his invented wife Marthe, in the hope that his wife will accept them as real.

Cast
 Gaby Morlay as Mme Pierre dite Mammy
 Pierre Larquey as Dr. André Pierre
 Françoise Arnoul as Marthe Roux
 Andrée de Chauveron as Geneviève 
 Claude Nicot as Le petit ami
 Micheline Gary as Lucette
 Solange Varenne as Marie
 Michel Jourdan as Le vrai Maurice
 Marcel Delaître as Un acolyte de Maurice
 Philippe Hersent as Un acolyte de Maurice
 Maurice Blanchot as Un acolyte de Maurice 
 Gaby Tyra as 	La soeur
 Luce Fabiole as La concierge
 Georges Sauval as Le boucher
 René Hell as Le vendeur de journaux
 Philippe Lemaire as 	Maurice Laprade

References

Bibliography 
 Rège, Philippe. Encyclopedia of French Film Directors, Volume 1. Scarecrow Press, 2009.

External links 
 

1951 films
1951 drama films
French drama films
1950s French-language films
Films directed by Jean Stelli
Films based on Spanish novels
1950s French films